Rusmir Halilović (born 5 January 1948) is a Yugoslavian basketball coach.

Coaching career

Taking over Yugoslavian NT selections 1981–1985
In 1981, Halilovic lead Buducnost Podgorica from the lower rank to Yugoslavian A1 league. He then began his professional career as coach for Yugoslavian Basketball Federation (KSJ – “Kosarkaski Savez Jugoslavije”) in charge of NT cadet and junior selections programs.

Halilovic was also the assistant coach of Mirko Novosel, who was later made a member of Naismith and the FIBA Hall of Fame. Halilovic also took on head coaching duties at three games of Yugoslavian senior NT during its American NCAA tour in 1982. In the initial game, Yugoslavian NT led by Drazen Petrovic won the game vs. one of the top ranked NCAA teams of that time.

During 1981, 1982, and 1983 regular American tours Halilovic, along with coaches Tanjevic and Novosel, often met and communicated with the top NCAA coaches such as Dean Smith (North Carolina), Joe B. Hall (Kentucky) and Digger Phelps (Notre Dame).

Work with Drazen Petrovic and future NBA players
He is most known for his key role in developing young international star Drazen Petrovic (coaching him each summer from his 15th to 19th year of life) and as many as total of eleven future NBA players from ex-Yugoslavia as well as many future Euroleague stars.

Although Drazen Petrovic was a great phenom himself whose career was influenced by a number of club coaches in Sibenka such as Zoran Slavnic and Faruk Kulenovic, Halilovic is the coach who greatly contributed to Petrovic's mental toughness, shooting precision, midrange game and overall approach to the game. It is still unknown that in 1984. Drazen was eager to return to Sibenka if Halilovic would have decided to take over as the head coach of the team from Sibenik.

Wide group of players Halilovic coached in Yugoslavian cadet and junior selections includes Drazen Petrovic, Vlade Divac, Toni Kukoc, Dino Radja, Zarko Paspalj, Jure Zdovc, Stojko Vrankovic, Danko Cvjeticanin, Velimir Perasovic, Milos Babic, Franjo Arapovic, Miroslav Pecarski, Luka Pavicevic, Teoman Alibegovic, Dragan Tarlac, Dalibor Bagaric, Bruno Sundov as well as many other prominent international players.

Halilovic was the one who first gathered and introduced to international basketball the extra talented group of youngsters which in 1987. under the leadership of Svetislav Pesic won World junior Championship in Bormio(Italy). Halilovic had great success with that same group from 1982. until 1984. winning silver medal in 1982. junior EC (Bulgaria), gold medal in 1983. cadet EC (Germany)and bronze medal in 1984. junior EC (Sweden).

Role in the formation of European Dream Teams (Yugoslavian, later Croatian and Serbian)
Many of players and coaches from ex-Yugoslavia today recognize and respect Halilovic's huge role in the process of identifying and developing top notch talents many of whom later formed great Yugoslavian senior NT which reached the very top of the world's basketball winning back-to-back European Championships in 1989. and 1991. and World Championship in 1990. under the leadership of the legendary coach Dusan Ivkovic.

At the very beginning of 1990es this majestic team consisting of the four future NBA stars (Petrovic, Divac, Kukoc, Radja), five more past or future NBA players (Paspalj, Vrankovic, Danilovic, Djordjevic, Tabak) and a couple of potential NBA players (Zdovc, Savic) was projected to make Barcelona Olympics final vs. original Dream Team. But the history unfortunately had other plans – ex-Yugoslavia was torn up by the war. As many as eight players Halilovic coached participated in 1992. legendary Barcelona Olympics final between Croatia and Dream Team.

From 1994. until 1996. Halilovic worked for Croatian Basketball Federation (HKS – “Hrvatski Košarkaški Savez”) as a junior NT coach. During that time he coached many future serviceable NBA players and future Euroleague stars – Bagaric, Sundov, Skelin, Grgat, Prkacin, Rimac, Mulaomerovic.

He returned to his hometown of Sarajevo in 1996. and opened a basketball academy RIN for the young basketball players regardless of their background and nationality. Although he first faced prejudices and skepticism RIN became a success story during next one and a half decade of existence, well known for its role and accomplishments all over Bosnia and Herzegovina. As a coordinator, Halilovic used experiences from his days with Yugoslavian NT selections, and thus embodied values of togetherness and teamwork to his selections, many reaching the very top.

Because of his unique work all over ex-Yugoslavian countries this regional basketball guru was given a nickname “Alien Identifier”. His work was also recognized by NBA back in 2001. when he was called up to be a part of Basketball Without Borders program when for the first time after Yugoslavian civil war NBA players from all six countries unified forces to work with the young prospects from the country which was torn by war.

Recent activity
After closing up his basketball academy for young players RIN Sarajevo which launched future international stars and Bosnia and Herzegovina NT members such as Goran Suton and Nihad Dedovic, along with Turkey NT member and 2014 FIBA EC MVP Cedi Osman. He resides in the capitol of Croatia, Zagreb.

He is still an active consultant of all major Croatian basketball teams (KK Cedevita Zagreb, KK Cibona Zagreb, KK Zadar, KK Zagreb), particularly involved in the area of developing top notch basketball prospects and searching for a players who have the potential to become the future leaders.

Last couple of years he was the leading coaching voice in the campaign of convincing Cibona Zagreb and Croatian NT coaching staff that future NBA player Dario Saric (Philadelphia 76ers) should be playing at the point guard position.

Recently he has also been active in scouting prospects who compete in the local development CroHoops league (Zagreb, Croatia).

His career is to be detailed in an upcoming book about international basketball during 1980s and early 1990s written by the Croatian freelance basketball journalist Marjan Crnogaj.

References

1948 births
Living people
Anadolu Efes S.K. coaches
Basketbol Süper Ligi head coaches
KK Budućnost coaches
Yugoslav basketball coaches